In the natural sciences, including physiology and engineering, a specific quantity generally refers to an intensive quantity obtained by dividing an extensive quantity of interest by mass. 
For example, specific leaf area is leaf area divided by leaf mass.

A named specific quantity is a generalization of the concept, in which the divisor quantity is not mass, the name of which is usually placed before "specific" in the term (e.g., thrust-specific fuel consumption). Named and unnamed specific quantities are given for the terms below.

Mass-specific quantities
Per unit of mass (short form of mass-specific):
 Specific absorption rate, power absorbed per unit mass of tissue at a given frequency
 Specific activity, radioactivity in becquerels per unit mass
 Specific energy, defined as energy per unit mass
 Specific enzyme activity, activity per milligram of total protein
 Specific internal energy, internal energy per unit mass
 Specific kinetic energy, kinetic energy of an object per unit of mass
 Specific enthalpy, enthalpy per unit mass
 Specific force, defined as the non-gravitational force per unit mass
 Specific growth rate, increase in cell mass per unit cell mass per unit time
 Specific heat capacity, heat capacity per unit mass, unless another unit is named, such as mole-specific heat capacity, or volume-specific heat capacity
 Specific latent heat, latent heat per unit mass
 Specific leaf area, leaf area per unit dry leaf mass
 Specific modulus, a materials property consisting of the elastic modulus per mass density of a material
 Specific orbital energy, orbital energy per unit mass
 Specific power, per unit of mass (or volume or area)
 Specific relative angular momentum, of two orbiting bodies is angular momentum per unit reduced mass, or the vector product of the relative position and the relative velocity
 Specific surface area, per unit of mass, volume, or cross-sectional area
 Specific volume, volume per unit mass, i.e. the reciprocal of density

Other specific quantities
Per unit of other type. The dividing unit is sometimes added before the term "specific", and sometimes omitted.
 Brake specific fuel consumption, fuel consumption per unit of braking power
 Thrust specific fuel consumption, fuel consumption per unit of thrust
 Specific acid catalysis, in which the reaction rate is proportional to the concentration of the protonated solvent molecules
 Specific acoustic impedance, ratio of sound pressure p to particle velocity v at a single frequency
 Specific capacity of a water well, quantity of water produced per (length) unit of drawdown
 Specific conductance, conductance per meter. Identical to electrical conductivity
 Specific detectivity of a photodetector
 Specific fuel consumption (disambiguation). Fuel consumption per unit thrust, or per unit power. Type defined as above.
 Specific gas constant, per molar mass
 Specific gravity, relative density with respect to water (density per water density)
 Specific heat of vaporization, enthalpy of vaporization, vaporizing heat per mole
 Specific humidity, mass of water vapor per unit mass dry air
 Specific impulse, impulse (momentum change) per unit of propellant (either per unit of propellant mass, or per unit of propellant by Earth-weight)
 Specific mass, actually meaning volume-specific mass, or mass per unit volume. Same as density
 Specific melting heat, enthalpy of fusion; melting heat per mole
 Specific modulus, elastic modulus per mass density
 Specific properties of a substance
 Specific resistance (disambiguation), several scientific meanings
 Specific rotation of a chemical, angle of optical rotation α of plane-polarized light per standard sample with a path length of one decimeter and a sample concentration of one gram per millilitre
 Specific speed, unitless figure of merit used to classify pump impellers (pump-specific) and turbines (turbine-specific). Ratio of performance against reference pump that needs one unit of speed to pump one unit volume per one unit hydraulic head pressure. For a turbine, it is performance measured against a reference turbine that develops one unit of power per one unit speed per one unit of hydraulic head.
 Specific storage, specific yield, and specific capacity, characterize the capacity of an aquifer to release groundwater from storage per unit decline in hydraulic head pressure
 Specific strength, material strength (pressure required at failure) per unit material density
 Specific surface area, per unit of mass, volume, or cross-sectional area
 Specific surface energy, free energy per unit surface-area
 Specific thrust, thrust per unit air intake rate
 Specific weight, weight per unit volume

References

See also
Intensive_and_extensive_properties#Specific_properties

Physical quantities